Leucoagaricus americanus is a mushroom in the genus Leucoagaricus, native to North America. It was first described by Charles Horton Peck, an American mycologist of the 19th and early 20th centuries, in 1869. It is widely distributed in North America, though more common east of the Rocky Mountains; it is saprobic, and grows on sawdust, on wood chips, on stumps, and on the ground.

Description
The cap is 3–15 cm and oval in shape when immature, becoming convex to flat when fully grown. The cap feels dry and smooth at the beginning, but gradually gets reddish to reddish brown scales. It is white in color but reddens with maturity or after being handled. The gills are free from the stipe and lie close together. They appear white when young and are stained pinkish to maroon. The stipe is 7–14 cm long, often enlarged at or below the middle and tapering toward the base. It appears white at first, staining or aging pink or reddish brown. It feels smooth with its silky hairs. The membranous veil leaves a white double edged ring on the upper stipe that may disappear in age. The spores are white to cream in color and measure 8–10 x 6–7.5 µm. The flesh is white throughout. It bruises yellow to orange when young but dries reddish when mature. The flesh is thick and discolors when cut, bruised or damaged. It is reported to be edible, but not recommended for consumption because of possible confusion with toxic species like Chlorophyllum molybdites.

See also
List of Leucoagaricus species

References

americanus
Fungi described in 1869
Fungi of North America
Taxa named by Charles Horton Peck